Für Alina (English: For Alina) is a work for piano composed by the Estonian composer Arvo Pärt. It can be considered as an essential work of his tintinnabuli style.

History of composition 
Für Alina was first performed in Tallinn in 1976, along with six other works, after a long preparatory period in Pärt's life as a composer. This concert was the first to introduce his new signature style of composition, referred to as the tintinnabuli style.

The title echoes Beethoven's piece for solo piano Für Elise. While the identity of the dedicatee of Beethoven's work is unclear, Für Alina was dedicated to a family friend's eighteen-year-old daughter. The family had broken up and the daughter went to England with her father. The work, dedicated to the daughter, was actually meant as a work of consolation for the girl's mother, missing her child. Its introspection calls to mind a vivid image of youth, off to explore the world.

Musical structure 

The piece appears very simple on the page. The score of Für Alina is only two pages long. It is in the key of B minor and is played piano (p). The only notation related to tempo is Ruhig, erhaben, in sich hineinhorchend, which roughly translates as peacefully, in an elevated and introspective manner. There is no time signature. According to the physicist Carlo Rovelli, who has spoken of his interest in the piece, time appears to have stopped here.

As notated, it could be played by a musician at beginner level. It has both the left and right hand written in G clef and only the echoing bass octave is written in F clef. Its simplicity is deceptive: it leaves a lot to the performer. To achieve purity of sound remains a challenge and demands an accomplished pianist with a good ear to produce the harmonic balance and symmetry the composition requires. It is common to repeat the composition several times. Variations could also be applied from one repetition to the other, like the exact 8ava of the two (melody) hands (stead for the length of each full repetition).

It begins with a low double-octave B, which echoes throughout the whole work (save for the last section); it should be played with the pedal down throughout (a single pedal shift is found before the last four bars). The right hand plays the notes an octave higher than noted. Considering there is no time signature, the tempo is free, yet introspective in a way that allows the player to personalize the experience of playing it by responding to the notes and occasional dissonance. Thus the use of rubato becomes essential. Both hands play their single notes at the same time.

Only two types of notes appear in the score: whole notes and stemless black notes (more free as to their duration). It has only 15 bars of written music: the first bar has the low bass octave. From there onwards begins the following pattern: the second bar has one note-head and one whole note, the next bar has two quarter notes and a whole note, and so on until a bar that has seven quarter notes and a whole note. This pattern then scales down again, to one quarter note and a half note. The last bar has two quarter notes and a half note. In other words, the first bar has one note, the second has two, the third has three, and so on. It is built as such: 1 2 3 4 5 6 7 8 7 6 5 4 3 2 3. The compositional symmetry mirrors the harmonic symmetry.

If played softly enough, with the pedal down and given enough time, the notes (often resulting in minor and major clashes between B and C#, D and E, and F# and G) can produce a humming of dissonance in the piano's machinery, a phenomenon that only adds to the transcendental nature of the piece.

The entire harmonic structure, save for one note, is constructed so that the left hand part is the highest note in a B Minor chord which is below the melody line. Thus, when the melody is on a C# or D, the left hand is on a B. When the melody is on an E or F#, the left hand is on a D, and when the melody is on a G, A, or B, the left hand is on an F#. The only break from this harmonic structure appears when the left hand hits a C# below an F# in the right hand, synchronous with the release of the pedal at the end of the 11th bar.

Recordings 
A release endorsed by Pärt himself is the ECM New Series album entitled Alina, recorded in July 1995 and released in 1999. It includes two variations of Für Alina by pianist Alexander Malter. According to the liner notes, the two versions, somewhat like “mood improvisations,” were handpicked by Pärt from a recording that was originally hours long. The two versions most strikingly differ in the use of rubato and that of the use of the low octave b. Both versions clock slightly under eleven minutes.

There are also versions by David Arden and Jeroen van Veen.

Use in soundtracks 
The piece has been used in film soundtracks, for example in the films Foxcatcher (2014), Abandon (2002), and Mostly Martha (2001), where it is performed by Alexander Malter.

Sources 

 This article draws some facts from the liner notes of the ECM album Alina, an essay White Light written by Hermann Conen and translated into English by Eileen Walliser-Schwarzbart.

External links 
 

Compositions by Arvo Pärt
1976 compositions
Compositions for solo piano
Music dedicated to family or friends